The 1964–65 season was Port Vale's 53rd season of football in the English Football League, and their sixth season in the Third Division. They went on a club record streak of 13 home games without a clean sheet from 26 September to 15 March. After an awful start to the season that saw the club bottom of the league, manager Freddie Steele left the club in February, and was replaced by one of his players, Jackie Mudie. A mini-revival under Mudie was not enough to prevent relegation at the end of the season, as the club finished five points adrift of safety in 22nd place. Their 41 goals scored in 46 league games was the worst record in the Football League, as Albert Cheesebrough managed to become the club's top-scorer with only seven goals.

Overview

Third Division
The pre-season saw manager Freddie Steele attempt to sign legendary Spurs striker Bobby Smith, this audacious attempt failed partly due to the financially precarious situation the club found itself in after the previous season. Instead Steele signed Ron Andrew from Stoke City for £3,000, as well as goalkeeper Reg Davies from Leyton Orient.

The season began with a 4–1 beating at Borough Park from Workington after Tony Richards found himself sidelined following an insect bite. They went on to pick up just three points in their next six league games. The fans were already showing their disappointment in the team twenty minutes before the end of the first home game – a 2–1 defeat to Colchester United. Ken Hancock and Jackie Mudie were both dropped following this game. Richards made his return only to suffer a knee injury which required surgery, thereby keeping him out of action for the rest of the campaign. On 5 September Billy Bingham had played his last game, as he broke his leg in a 4–0 beating by Brentford at Griffin Park. Two successive mid-September 1–0 victories (both goals scored by Albert Cheesebrough) were rare bright rays of sunshine for the "Valiants". A 'punchless' and 'guileless' run of twelve games without a win followed, which saw the club drop to third from bottom, as attendances tailed off accordingly. Cheeseborough also picked up an injury, whilst Mudie found he was now unable to play on hard surfaces. Reserves filled the gaps in the first eleven as at Vale Park 'the loud mouths on the terraces certainly did a good job [of] hindering Stan Trafford' on his home debut on 17 October. Goals in short-supply, numerous players were tried in the centre-forward role, to no avail.

On 21 November, Vale picked up their third league win of the campaign, beating lowly Barnsley 2–0 at Oakwell. Youth players continued to be drafted in as Vale finished the year with four straight league defeats, picking up injuries and sendings off along the way. In December, Hancock was sold to Ipswich Town for £10,000. A 2–1 victory over promotion-chasers Brentford on 2 January failed to spark a revival, partly due to the fact that the Bees were forced to play almost the entire match with ten players and an outside player in goal following an injury to Chic Brodie. Steele tried to play a settled team, but that proved to be as unsuccessful as when he switched the team round constantly. By the end of the month the club were bottom of the league and morale was low. In mid-February, the club four points short of safety, Steele left the club 'by mutual consent', as Jackie Mudie was appointed caretaker manager. Following a 4–0 hammering from Gillingham, Mudie signed veteran stopper Jimmy O'Neill from Darlington, and the former Ireland international seemed to improve the team, as just two defeats in eight games followed. Mudie instilled discipline into the team, and so was made manager on a permanent basis on 3 March. He then ensured Reg Davies was transferred to Leyton Orient. He tried and failed to re-sign Terry Harkin from Crewe Alexandra. One win in their final six games doomed the Vale to relegation, just as survival seemed possible. Only 3,521 witnessed a final day victory over Walsall.

They finished in twenty-second position, their 32 points five short of safety. Losing ten home games, they also recorded just two wins on their travels. No team in the top four divisions scored fewer than Vale's 41 goals, as Cheeseborough took the honour of top-scorer with a mere seven goals – this was the lowest total for a Vale top-scorer in a Football League season since Meshach Dean scored six in 1892–93 (in a 22-game league season).

Finances
On the financial side, a £15,497 was recorded despite a donation of £16,320 from the Sportsmen's Association, the Development Fund, and the social club. The average home attendance was a mere 5,508, almost half that of the previous season. Gate receipts had plummeted to just £24,117, compared to a wage bill of £41,092; meanwhile a £6,250 profit was made on transfers. A clear-out of players could not be avoided, as twelve were handed free transfers, including: Billy Bingham (retired); Stan Steele (left the country); Ron Smith (Southport); Ron Andrew (retired); Tim Rawlings (Nuneaton Borough); Stan Trafford (retired); and Albert Cheesebrough (joined Mansfield Town for free, although Vale had wanted £5,000 for him).

Cup competitions
In the FA Cup, Vale made 'an inglorious passage' past amateurs Hendon of the Isthmian League with a difficult 2–1 victory. Fourth Division Millwall proved to be too tough an opponent in the Second Round however, as the "Lions" picked a 'decisive' 4–0 win at The Den.

In the League Cup, once again the club exited at the first hurdle, this time going down 1–0 to Luton Town at home.

League table

Results

Football League Third Division

Results by matchday
Port Vale's score comes first

Matches

FA Cup

League Cup

Player statistics

Appearances

Top scorers

Transfers

Transfers in

Transfers out

References
Specific

General

Port Vale F.C. seasons
Port Vale